The coastal she-oak slender bluetongue (Cyclodomorphus michaeli) is a species of lizard in the family Scincidae. The species is endemic to Australia, from the New England region of New South Wales south to eastern Victoria.

References

Cyclodomorphus
Skinks of Australia
Reptiles described in 1984
Taxa named by Richard Walter Wells
Taxa named by Cliff Ross Wellington